Nicolas Desenclos (born 11 February 1989) is a French footballer .

Biography

Early career
Born in Marseille, Desenclos started his career in Montpellier. In mid-2007 he moved to Italian champion Internazionale and played in pre-season friendlies. He then allegedly sold to Triestina in co-ownership deal, but remained in Inter's reserve.

However, Inter in fact borrowed Triestina's license to sign him from Izola and Triestina "sold" him to Inter in co-own deal for €530,000; Izola itself signed him from Montpellier. Triestina paid Izola €400,000 to sign Desenclos; Michel Orneck for €300,000 and Thierry Audel for €200,000, which the liquidator accused for false accounting.

In June 2008 the co-ownership deal was renewed. (but terminated during 2008–09 season) On 30 August, he moved to Spanish Segunda División B. That season the team finished as the seventh.

Eupen
On 31 August 2009 he moved to Belgian Second Division side Eupen along with Sulaiman Sesay Fullah. Desenclos played 5 times in the second division and played in the playoffs, which the team promoted. After the season, he remained with Eupen but only played once: in 2010–11 Belgian Cup. However, he returned to starting XI for second division playoffs to decide which team secured the last berth to 2011–12 Belgian Pro League, as Eupen winning Pro League relegation playoffs against last placed Charleroi. He started the fifth match as Eupen mathematically relegated (or fail to win the playoffs).

During 2011–12 season his contract with Inter was terminated with mutual consent.

References

External links
 

French footballers
Montpellier HSC players
Inter Milan players
Racing de Ferrol footballers
K.A.S. Eupen players
Chamois Niortais F.C. players
French expatriate footballers
Expatriate footballers in Italy
Expatriate footballers in Spain
Expatriate footballers in Belgium
French expatriate sportspeople in Italy
French expatriate sportspeople in Spain
French expatriate sportspeople in Belgium
Association football central defenders
Footballers from Marseille
1989 births
Living people